Enemy Records is an independent record label based in Brooklyn, New York and Munich, Germany, founded in 1986. Its debut was the free jazz album Last Exit by the band of the same name.

History
The label was founded in 1986 by music enthusiast Michael Knuth and composer Bill Laswell. Eventually the two parted ways, with Knuth retaining sole distribution rights. The label primarily focused on issuing records by artists who were influenced by jazz and experimental music. It served as an outlet for musical acts such as Gary Lucas, Sonny Sharrock, Last Exit, 24-7 Spyz, Crash Worship and Universal Congress Of.

Discography
Enemy Records released 60 albums between 1986 and 1996

References

External links

American independent record labels
German independent record labels
Alternative rock record labels
Jazz record labels
Punk record labels
Record labels established in 1986
Companies based in Munich
Companies based in Brooklyn